Bhabha Institute of Education also known by BIE, Gaya is a unit of Buddha Group of Institutions, it is a Teacher Training college situated in Gaya, Bihar, India. The college,  approved by NCTE and UGC for courses B.Ed. & D.El.Ed and affiliated by Magadh University for B.Ed. & Bihar School Examination Board for D.El.Ed from 2010.

Courses
 B.Ed
 D.El.Ed

See also
 List of teacher education schools in India
 Teacher Training College, Gaya

References

External links
 Official Website : Bhabha Institute of Education

Colleges of education in India
Gaya, India
Education in Bihar
Educational institutions in India with year of establishment missing